The Journal for the Academic Study of Religion is a triannual peer-reviewed academic journal covering all aspects of the academic study of religion. It is published by Equinox Press on behalf of the Australian Association for the Study of Religion and was established in 1988 as the Australian Religion Studies Review, obtaining its current title in 2005. The editor-in-chief is Douglas Ezzy (University of Tasmania).

Abstracting and indexing
The journal is abstracted and indexed in the ATLA Religion Database, Emerging Sources Citation Index, and Scopus.

References

External links
 

English-language journals
Publications established in 1988
Triannual journals
Religious studies journals
Equinox Publishing (Sheffield) academic journals